The arrondissement of Privas is an arrondissement of France in the Ardèche department in the Auvergne-Rhône-Alpes region. It has 66 communes.

Composition

The communes of the arrondissement of Privas are:

Ajoux
Alba-la-Romaine
Alissas
Aubignas
Baix
Beauchastel
Beauvène
Bidon
Bourg-Saint-Andéol
Chalencon
Châteauneuf-de-Vernoux
Chomérac
Coux
Creysseilles
Cruas
Dunière-sur-Eyrieux
Flaviac
Freyssenet
Gilhac-et-Bruzac
Gluiras
Gourdon
Gras
Larnas
Lyas
Marcols-les-Eaux
Meysse
Les Ollières-sur-Eyrieux
Pourchères
Le Pouzin
Pranles
Privas
Rochemaure
Rochessauve
Rompon
Saint-Apollinaire-de-Rias
Saint-Bauzile
Saint-Cierge-la-Serre
Saint-Étienne-de-Serre
Saint-Fortunat-sur-Eyrieux
Saint-Jean-Chambre
Saint-Julien-du-Gua
Saint-Julien-en-Saint-Alban
Saint-Julien-le-Roux
Saint-Just-d'Ardèche
Saint-Lager-Bressac
Saint-Laurent-du-Pape
Saint-Marcel-d'Ardèche
Saint-Martin-d'Ardèche
Saint-Martin-sur-Lavezon
Saint-Maurice-en-Chalencon
Saint-Michel-de-Chabrillanoux
Saint-Montan
Saint-Pierre-la-Roche
Saint-Priest
Saint-Sauveur-de-Montagut
Saint-Symphorien-sous-Chomérac
Saint-Thomé
Saint-Vincent-de-Barrès
Saint-Vincent-de-Durfort
Silhac
Le Teil
Valvignères
Vernoux-en-Vivarais
Veyras
Viviers
La Voulte-sur-Rhône

History

The arrondissement of Privas was created in 1800. In 2007 it lost the four cantons of Antraigues-sur-Volane, Aubenas, Vals-les-Bains and Villeneuve-de-Berg to the arrondissement of Largentière. At the January 2017 reorganization of the arrondissements of Ardèche, it gained eight communes from the arrondissement of Tournon-sur-Rhône and it lost five communes to the arrondissement of Tournon-sur-Rhône and two communes to the arrondissement of Largentière.

As a result of the reorganisation of the cantons of France which came into effect in 2015, the borders of the cantons are no longer related to the borders of the arrondissements. The cantons of the arrondissement of Privas were, as of January 2015:

 Bourg-Saint-Andéol
 Chomérac
 Privas
 Rochemaure
 Saint-Pierreville
 Viviers
 La Voulte-sur-Rhône

References

Privas